Alanna Knight MBE (24 February 1923 – 2 December 2020), born Gladys Allan Cleet, was a British writer, based in Edinburgh. She wrote over sixty novels, including romances, mysteries, crime, historical, and time travel stories, as well as plays, biographies, and histories. She sometimes also published under the pen name Margaret Hope.

Early life 
Gladys Allan Cleet was from Jesmond, Newcastle, the daughter of Herbert Cleet and Gladys Allan Cleet. Her father was a butcher. She trained as a secretary as a young woman.

Career 
In 1964, in her forties, Knight became paralysed by polyneuritis (neuropathy), and her husband gave her an electric typewriter to help in her recovery. By the time the paralysis ended five years later, she had written her first novel, Legend of the Loch (1969). She would continue writing, publishing over sixty books in her last fifty years. Her best known series was the Inspector Faro mysteries, set in the nineteenth century, but she also wrote a series about a time-traveling detective, Tam Eildor, and series about women detectives; she wrote gothic romances, true crime, writing advice, memoirs, and biography.

Knight was honorary president of the Edinburgh Writers Club, a founder and honorary president of the Scottish Association of Writers, and an active member of the Crime Writers' Association. She taught creative writing and lectured on the topic in various settings, from universities to Bloody Scotland, a literary convention. She was also a portrait and landscape painter.

Knight was made a Member of the British Empire for services to literature in 2014.

Personal life 
Gladys Cleet married scientist Alistair Knight in 1951, in Aberdeen. They had two sons, Christopher and Kevin. She died in 2020 after suffering a stroke in Edinburgh at the age of 97.

Selected bibliography

Fiction written as Margaret Hope
 The Queen's Captain (1978)
 The Shadow Queen (1979)
 Hostage Most Royal (1980)
 Perilous Voyage (1983)

Fiction written as Alanna Knight

 Legend of the Loch (1969)
 The October Witch (1971)
 Castle Clodha (1972)
 Lament for Lost Lovers (1972)
 The White Rose (1973)
 Passionate Kindness (1974, also published as A Violent Passion)
 A Stranger Came By (1974)
 A Drink for the Bridge (1976, also published as The Most Tragic Tay Bridge Disaster)
 The Wicked Wynsleys (1977)
 Girl on an Empty Swing (1978)
 The Black Duchess (1980)
 Castle of Foxes (1981)
 Colla's Children (1982)
 The Clan (1985)
Estella (1986)
 Enter Second Murderer (1988, the first Inspector Jeremy Faro mystery)
 Blood Line (1989)
 Deadly Beloved (1989)
 Killing Cousins (1990)
 The Wicked Wynsleys (1990)
 A Quiet Death (1991)
 To Kill a Queen (1992)
 The Sweet Cheat Gone (1992)
 Strathblair (1993)
 This Outward Angel (1993)
 The Evil that Men Do (1993)
 The Missing Duchess (1994)
 The Bull Slayers (1995)
 Murder by Appointment (1996)
 Angel Eyes (1997)
 The Coffin Lane Murders (1998)
 The Monster in the Loch (1999, for new readers)
 The Royal Park Murder (1999, for new readers)
 Dead Beckoning (1999, for new readers)
 The Inspector's Daughter (2000, the first Rose McQuinn novel)
 The Dagger in the Crown (2001, the first Tam Eildor novel)
 Dangerous Pursuits (2002)
 In the Shadow of the Minster (2002)
 The Final Enemy (2002)
 An Orkney Murder (2003)
 The Gowry Conspiracy (2003)
 Ghost Walk (2004)
 Unholy Trinity (2004, also known as Death at Carasheen)
 Faro and the Royals (2005)
 The Stuart Sapphire (2005)
 Burke and Hare (2007, non-fiction)
 Destroying Angel (2007)
 Murder in Paradise (2008)
 Quest for a Killer (2010)
 The Seal King Murders (2011)
 Deadly Legacy (2012)
 Murder Most Foul (2013)
 The Midnight Visitor (2013)
 The Balmoral Incident (2014)
 Miss Havisham's Revenge, Estella's Missing Years (2014)
 Akin to Murder (2016)
 The Darkness Within (2017)
 Murder Lies Waiting (2018)
 The Dower House Mystery (2019)
 Murder at the World's Edge (2021, forthcoming)

Nonfiction

 The Private Life of Robert Louis Stevenson (1983, play)
 The Robert Louis Stevenson Treasury (1985) 
 R. L. S. in the South Seas: An intimate photographic record (1986, editor)Boyle, Richard A. “DEAD MAN'S CHEST: TRAVELS AFTER ROBERT LOUIS STEVENSON, by Nicholas Rankin (Book Review).” Victorian Studies; Bloomington, Ind. Vol. 32, Iss. 3,  (Spring 1989): 450-52. 
 Close and Deadly: Chilling Murders in the Heart of Edinburgh (2002, non-fiction)
 101 Golden Rules for Writing Successful Fiction (2015, professional advice)
 My Psychic Life, Mostly (2018, autobiography)
 My Writing Life, Mostly'' (2020, autobiography)

References

External links 

 Alanna Knight's official website.

1923 births
2020 deaths
20th-century British writers
21st-century British writers
British women writers
British crime writers
British mystery writers
20th-century pseudonymous writers
21st-century pseudonymous writers
Pseudonymous women writers